Caleb Martin Furst (born May 18, 2002) is an American college basketball player for the Purdue Boilermakers of the Big Ten Conference.

High school career
Furst played basketball for Blackhawk Christian School in Fort Wayne, Indiana. He won a Class A state title as a sophomore. In his junior season, Furst averaged 22.1 points, 13.4 rebounds, 3.6 assists and two blocks per game, helping Blackhawk achieve a 23–3 record. As a senior, he averaged 21.4 points, 14.1 rebounds, three assists and 2.2 blocks per game, leading his team to a 28–3 record and the Class 2A state championship. At the end of the season, Furst was named Indiana Mr. Basketball and Indiana Gatorade Player of the Year. He left as his school's all-time leader in points and rebounds. A consensus four-star recruit, he committed to playing college basketball for Purdue over offers from Indiana, Michigan State, Louisville and Virginia, among others.

College career
On November 16, 2021, in his second career game, Furst collected his first career double-double with 14 points and 11 rebounds against Wright State. He averaged 4.1 points, 3.2 rebounds and 0.4 assists per game as a freshman. Following the season, Furst underwent left foot surgery.

National team career
Furst represented the United States at the 2021 FIBA Under-19 World Cup in Latvia. He averaged 7.1 points and 4.1 rebounds per game, helping his team win the gold medal.

Career statistics

College

|-
| style="text-align:left;"| 2021–22
| style="text-align:left;"| Purdue
| 34 || 12 || 14.6 || .573 || .423 || .717 || 3.2 || .4 || .2 || .2 || 4.1

Personal life
Furst is the son of Gary and Lotus Furst. He has two brothers, Nathan, who played soccer at Blackhawk Christian School as a goalkeeper, and Joshua.

References

External links
Purdue Boilermakers bio
USA Basketball bio

2002 births
Living people
American men's basketball players
Basketball players from Fort Wayne, Indiana
Centers (basketball)
Power forwards (basketball)
Purdue Boilermakers men's basketball players